1-Benzyl-4-[2-(diphenylmethoxy)ethyl]piperidine is a stimulant of the piperidine class which acts as a potent and selective dopamine reuptake inhibitor. It is closely related to vanoxerine and GBR-12,935, which in contrast are piperazines.

See also 
 Vanoxerine
 GBR-12,935
 Desoxypipradrol

References 

Piperidines
Stimulants
Benzyl compounds